Manuel "Manny" Franco (born December 19, 1994) is a Puerto Rican professional jockey, best known for winning the 2020 Belmont Stakes riding Tiz the Law.

, he has won 1,357 of his 9,435 career starts, and has finished in-the-money in 42% of his starts.

References

Further reading

External links
 Belmont Stakes 2020 (FULL RACE) | NBC Sports via YouTube

1994 births
People from Carolina, Puerto Rico
Living people
Puerto Rican jockeys